Vambraces (French: avant-bras, sometimes known as lower cannons in the Middle Ages) or forearm guards are tubular or gutter defences for the forearm worn as part of a suit of plate armour that were often connected to gauntlets. Vambraces may be worn with or without separate couters in a full suit of medieval armour. The term originates in the early 14th century. They were made from either boiled leather or steel. Leather vambraces were sometimes reinforced with longitudinal strips of hardened hide or metal, creating splinted armour.

See also
 Bracer, armguard used by archers
 Manica, armguard of the ancient Romans

External links
 The Armour Archive examples and construction information for replica vambraces
 Metal vambrace with integrated elbow and upper arm protection (replica)

Medieval armour
Western plate armour
History of clothing (Western fashion)
Armwear